WBIO (94.7 FM, "True Country") is an American radio station licensed to serve the community of Philpot, Kentucky. The station is owned and operated by Hancock Communications, Inc., doing business as the Cromwell Radio Group.

WBIO broadcasts a classic country music format to the greater Owensboro, Kentucky, area.

WBIO is also the home radio station for Kentucky Wesleyan Panthers men's basketball, with Joel Utley having served as the voice of the Panthers for over 50 years.

On August 1, 2018, WBIO began simulcasting with sister station WKCM & both stations rebranded as "Country Classics".

Former Logo

References

External links
Hancock Communications official website

BIO
Classic country radio stations in the United States